Kinfauns Castle is a 19th-century castle in the Scottish village of Kinfauns, Perth and Kinross. It is in the Castellated Gothic style, with a slight asymmetry typical of Scottish Georgian. It stands on a raised terrace facing south over the River Tay. The house is protected as a category A listed building, and the grounds are included in the Inventory of Gardens and Designed Landscapes in Scotland.

History

In reward for his services at the capture of Perth in 1313, Thomas de Longueville was granted land east of Perth by Robert the Bruce. Thomas married the heiress of Charteris of Kinfauns and changed his name to Charteris. He built a castle named Kinfauns Castle on the lands granted. His family had a long-running feud with the Ruthvens of Perth and in 1552 John Charteris was murdered by the Ruthvens on the High Street (Royal Mile) in Edinburgh. The property passed from the Charteris family to the Carnegies and from there to the Blairs. Charteris' sword is believed to still be within the castle.

The old estate and former castle passed into the Gray family when a Blair heiress married the 11th Lord Gray in 1741. The current castle was designed by Sir Robert Smirke and built between 1822 and 1826 by Francis Gray, 14th Lord Gray, on the site of a medieval stronghold. It passed to the Stuart Earls of Moray in 1878 and descended in that family to the 17th Earl of Moray. He commissioned several improvements; the walled garden and gardener's cottage were designed by Francis William Deas in 1910. After the death of the 17th Earl in 1930 the estate became the property of Scottish Estates Ltd, who sold off most of the land piecemeal.

The house and remaining land is currently occupied by Scottish businesswoman Ann Gloag, co-founder of the Stagecoach company.

Railway
During the build-up to Dundee and Perth Railway's opening in 1847, Lord Gray would only allow the line to come through his estate for a then-hefty fee of £12,000.

Cultural reference
The Union-Castle Line steamer RMS Kinfauns Castle was launched in 1899 and was named after this building. The vessel was painted by Charles de Lacy.

References

Castles in Perth and Kinross
Houses in Perth and Kinross
Category A listed buildings in Perth and Kinross
Listed castles in Scotland
Inventory of Gardens and Designed Landscapes